Lucette Taero is a politician from French Polynesia. In 2001 she became the president of the Assembly of French Polynesia, the first woman to hold the position.

Biography 
Taero served as a government minister under President Gaston Flosse for five years prior to becoming assembly president. In 2008 she resigned from the party she belonged to, Tahoeraa Huiraatira Party.

In 2004, Taero punched an opposition Member of Parliament during an assembly session.

References

Government ministers of French Polynesia
Living people
French Polynesian women in politics
Year of birth missing (living people)